Oxossia calyptrocarpa, a member of  Turneroideae (Passifloraceae), is a shrub native to the wet tropics of eastern Brazil. It is 0.2-2.5 meter tall with highly plasticitic leaves and white to lilac flowers. 

It was previously classified as Turnera, however, phylogenetic analysis supported its classification as Oxossia.

References 

Passifloraceae
Flora of Brazil